Live at 5 is a Canadian television news program that airs weekdays on CP24 from 5:00 - 5:30 p.m.  Starting in July 2017, CTV Toronto started to simulcast the program in addition to Live at 5:30. The show features breaking news, weather, and traffic. Also a brief look at the Top Stories of the day. The special weather forecast will be presented by meteorologist Chris Potter.

History
Live at 5 premiered on January 14, 2008, as a 15-minute newscast before going to talk shows, the original hosts were, Ann Rohmer and George Lagogianes. On January 19, 2010, the program was expanded to 30-minutes in the wake of budget cuts at Rogers Media's Citytv stations across Canada including the cancellation of their 5 p.m. newscast for Toronto which is now followed by its newly launched half-hour newscast, Live at 5:30.

Set
The CP24 studio is located on the second floor of 299 Queen Street West. Large north-facing windows look out towards Queen Street. The set and newsroom is home to Live at 5 and most of the other CP24-produced programming.

Current presenters
 Host(s): Stephaine Smyth
 Weather: Chris Potter (meteorologist)
 Traffic: Rotating

See also
 Live at 5:30 (Canadian TV program)

External links
CP24
CTV Announcement: CP24 Now Offers Toronto Viewers More Early News With LIVE AT 5 and LIVE AT 5:30

2000s Canadian television news shows
2008 Canadian television series debuts
Canadian talk radio programs
2010s Canadian television news shows
2020s Canadian television news shows